Juvenile Jungle is a 1958 American crime film directed by William Witney and written by Arthur T. Horman. The film stars Corey Allen, Rebecca Welles, Richard Bakalyan, Anne Whitfield, Joe Di Reda and Joe Conley. The film was released on April 24, 1958 by Republic Pictures.

Plot

Cast       
Corey Allen as Hal McQueen
Rebecca Welles as Glory
Richard Bakalyan as Tic-Tac
Anne Whitfield as Carolyn Elliot
Joe Di Reda as Monte
Joe Conley as Duke
Walter Coy as John Elliot
Taggart Casey as Lt. Milford
Hugh Lawrence as Officer Ed Ellis
Leon Tyler as Ballpark usher
Harvey Grant as Pete
Louise Arthur as Mrs. Elliot

References

External links 
 

1958 films
American crime films
1958 crime films
Republic Pictures films
Films directed by William Witney
1950s English-language films
1950s American films